Born to Fight may refer to:

Born to Fight (1936 film), an American boxing film starring Frankie Darro
Born to Fight (1984 film), a Thai action film
Born to Fight (1989 film), an action film
Born to Fight (2004 film), a Thai action film
Knockout (2011 film), released with the title Born to Fight
Born to Fight (album), a 2018 album by Karise Eden